Caloptilia citrochrysa is a moth of the family Gracillariidae. It is known from India (Bihar).

The larvae feed on Drypetes roxburghii. They mine the leaves of their host plant.

References

citrochrysa
Moths described in 1930
Moths of Asia